Ismail Siddiq, also known as Ismail Siddiq Pasha and Ismail Al Mufash, (1830–1876) was an Egyptian statesman who served as the finance minister from 1868 to 1876. He was one of the prominent members of the dhawāt which refers to noble individuals occupying major offices in Egypt at that period.

Biography
Siddiq was born in 1830. His mother was the wet nurse of Khedive Ismail who ruled Egypt between 1863 and 1879.

Siddiq was inspector general responsible for Lower Egypt and was named inspector general of Egypt in 1866. He was a member of the three-member regency council which was formed in June 1867 as a result of the minority of Khedive Ismail's son Tewfik. Siddiq was appointed head of finance department in 1868 being the first non-Turk who held these two significant offices for the first time. He also served as a financial agent for Khedive Ismail dealing with his personal finance.

In November 1876 Siddiq was arrested by Khedive Ismail in Saray al Jazirah and sent to exile in Dongola, Sudan, where he was put into a prison. According to the official announcement few weeks after this incident Siddiq died there, but Wageeh Wahba of Egyptian Today newspaper argues that Siddiq was murdered by the Khedive's forces, and his body was thrown into the Nile river.

In 1866 Siddiq constructed a palace in Lazoughli square, Cairo, called Ismail Siddiq Pasha Al Mufash Palace.

References

19th-century Egyptian people
1830 births
1876 deaths
Assassinated Egyptian politicians
Egyptian pashas
Finance Ministers of Egypt